Yani Urdinov (Macedonian: Јани Урдинов; born 28 March 1991) is a retired professional footballer who played as a left-back. Born in Belgium, he represented North Macedonia at international level.

International career
Urdinov was part of the Macedonia U21 national team from 2009 to 2012. On 26 May 2012, he made his debut for the senior national team in a friendly match against Portugal in Leiria. He earned a total of three caps and his final international was an August 2012 friendly against Lithuania.

Honours
Ekranas
A Lyga: 2012

Željezničar Sarajevo
Bosnian Premier League: 2012–13

References

External links
 Profile at MacedonianFootball 

1991 births
Living people
Sportspeople from Mechelen
Footballers from Antwerp Province
Association football fullbacks
Macedonian footballers
Belgian footballers
North Macedonia international footballers
Roda JC Kerkrade players
FK Rabotnički players
FK Ekranas players
FK Željezničar Sarajevo players
Widzew Łódź players
KF Shkëndija players
Flamurtari Vlorë players
FC Vysočina Jihlava players
Zira FK players
MFK Ružomberok players
FK Velež Mostar players
Macedonian First Football League players
A Lyga players
Premier League of Bosnia and Herzegovina players
Ekstraklasa players
Kategoria Superiore players
Czech First League players
Azerbaijan Premier League players
Slovak Super Liga players
Belgian expatriate footballers
Macedonian expatriate footballers
Expatriate footballers in Lithuania
Macedonian expatriate sportspeople in Lithuania
Belgian expatriate sportspeople in Lithuania
Expatriate footballers in Bosnia and Herzegovina
Macedonian expatriate sportspeople in Bosnia and Herzegovina
Belgian expatriate sportspeople in Bosnia and Herzegovina
Expatriate footballers in Poland
Macedonian expatriate sportspeople in Poland
Belgian expatriate sportspeople in Poland
Expatriate footballers in Albania
Macedonian expatriate sportspeople in Albania
Belgian expatriate sportspeople in Albania
Expatriate footballers in the Czech Republic
Macedonian expatriate sportspeople in the Czech Republic
Belgian expatriate sportspeople in the Czech Republic
Expatriate footballers in Azerbaijan
Macedonian expatriate sportspeople in Azerbaijan
Belgian expatriate sportspeople in Azerbaijan
Expatriate footballers in Slovakia
Macedonian expatriate sportspeople in Slovakia
Belgian expatriate sportspeople in Slovakia